Ringette in Canada began in 1963 when it was first conceptualized by Sam Jacks of North Bay, Ontario, in West Ferris. The sport of ringette is played in all 10 Canadian provinces and the Northwest Territories and involves an average of over 31,000 registered players every year. Canada is the location of ringette's origin where it is also recognized as a national heritage sport. The sport is governed nationally by Ringette Canada. Canadian provinces and territories have their own individual governing bodies in their respective jurisdictions.

In Canada, ringette serves as an important example of how girls and women can help take control of their own sports development rather than being treated as mere substitutes for, or an alternative to male-dominated sports, or as only important in their adjacency to male athletes who compete in the same sport. Ringette was created due to broomball and female ice hockey programs failing to attract the interest of girls and complaints that sports programs tended to be "too male-oriented".

The idea that ringette was developed as a result of girls and women being prohibited from playing ice hockey is a common but untrue myth that is widely spread by Canadian media, as well as by a number of sports organizations and people. However, it is an established fact that the first ringette team in history was a group of girls who played ice hockey in high school in Espanola, Ontario, Canada in 1963, and women began playing ice hockey in Canada in the late 1800s. By the 1800s, women were also playing bandy in a number of European nations, but the sport, which had its organized beginnings in England, did not successfully develop in North America and ultimately evolved into what is now known as ice hockey. 

Two other related myths assert that ringette was either a patriarchal ploy by men to "force" girls and women to cease playing ice hockey, or that ringette was created as a safer alternative to hockey for girls. No evidence for these myths exist and are misandrist conspiracy theories. Female ice hockey engages in intense inter-sport politics when recruiting on-ice talent for female ice hockey from the ringette talent pool as a result of ringette's existence and success in Canada, a success rate which has generated discontent in some female ice hockey and feminist sports circles. The female Canadian ice hockey establishment, feminist academics, and the entire country of Canada's feminist sports culture have all periodically expressed open antagonism for ringette as a result of its unusual success with the premise being that ringette is inferior to female hockey because it does not involve a narrative which involves a struggle against men or a desire to be more like them. These groups typically support gender theory ideologies that push narratives of male oppression, which do not apply well to ringette because it is an autonomous female sport which has a different history, different goals, and different ambitions which typically do not conflict with male interests and vice versa.

From the beginning, ringette was unconventional in its approach, having been created exclusively for girls rather than following the traditional approach whereby a separate female equivalent is developed from a sport already popular among the male population. The first basic rules were drafted by Sam Jacks, but its first official rules were drafted in Espanola, Ontario, by Mirl Arthur "Red" McCarthy between 1964 and 1965. The first ringette team in history was a group of Canadian girls from Espanola, Ontario who had played female high school ice hockey. The team experimented with the rules being developed by Mirl McCarthy and helped him further his goals by giving him feedback.

Ringette is played by Canadians from the youth level to the adult level with competition ranging from recreational to elite high performance competitions. In Canada players compete locally, provincially, nationally and internationally in European tournaments and the World Ringette Championships, as well as at the university and college level and the semi-professional level. Ringette is also a sport in the Canada Winter Games, a multi-sport competition for amateur Canadian athletes. 1979 marked the first time a Canadian ringette team traveled overseas to Europe (Finland).

National governing body

The national governing body for the sport of ringette in Canada is Ringette Canada based in Ottawa, Ontario and is also responsible for the promotion the sport nationally. Ringette Canada is a member of the International Ringette Federation (IRF). Ringette Canada's national hall of fame, the Ringette Canada Hall of Fame, was established in 1988.

Ringette Canada Hall of Fame
Ringette Canada established the "Ringette Canada Hall of Fame" (RCHOF) in 1988. The RCHOF includes six categories: Founder, Builder, Official, Team, Coach, and Athlete. A number of Canadian national ringette teams have been inducted over the course of its existence, as well as players, builders, coaches, and officials.

Provincial and territorial associations
Canada's provincial and territorial ringette associations are listed in the table below.

Competitive structure
Levels of competition in Canada are based on age group and skill, and range from recreational to competitive. Elite level competition includes university and college ringette, the National Ringette League, and the Canada national ringette team.

Levels of competition in Canadian ringette include: Recreational, C, B, BB, A, and AA and AAA, with AA being the highest level at which league competition occurs. AAA ringette is typically specific to particular regions who feel another category is necessary to clarify their league or tournament play. For example: AAA teams out of Quebec have played AA teams out of Alberta at various tournaments, including the Canadian Ringette Championships.

National ringette teams

Canada selects two national ringette teams for international competition: Team Canada Junior and Team Canada Senior. The roster for Team Canada's modern-day makeup for its senior national team includes athletes who either play or have played in Canada's semi-professional National Ringette League. Both teams compete in the World Ringette Championships (WRC).

The first all-Canadian national ringette consisted of adult and young adult ringette players and was established in 1996 and competed in the third World Ringette Championships, though Canada's first international appearance in ringette took place at the first World Ringette Championships in Gloucester, Ontario, at the 1990 World Ringette Championships. At the first World Ringette Championships, five teams from five separate Canadian provinces were represented: Alberta, Saskatchewan, Manitoba, Ontario, and Quebec. A sixth Canadian team, Team Gloucester, also competed having been selected to participate due to the fact that Gloucester served as the international tournaments host city. Canada has competed at every World Ringette Championships since, though a new division for junior players was eventually created in the early part of the 21st century beginning in 2009.

Canada's first all-Canadian junior national team was established for the 2013 World Ringette Championships. Previously, Canada's junior elite ringette players had competed in the World Junior Ringette Championships which first occurred in 2009 and then 2012 before the junior program was merged with the World Ringette Championships itself, resulting a new junior division. For the 2009 and 2012 world junior competitions, Canada sent two different junior teams to represent Canada at the world tournament, Team Canada East and Team Canada West.

Semi-professional league 

The National Ringette League (also indicated by the initials NRL) is Canada's premier, semi-professional showcase league for the sport of ringette and was introduced during the 2004–2005 ringette season. It is Canada's national league for elite ringette players aged 18+.

The final competition for the National Ringette League is held annually at the Canadian Ringette Championships. The winning team in the NRL division is awarded the Jeanne Sauvé Memorial Cup named after the late Governor General of Canada, Jeanne Sauvé. Initially coined the Jeanne Sauvé Cup and initiated in December 1984, it was first presented at the 1985 Canadian Ringette Championships in Dollard des Ormeaux, Québec. Now called the Jeanne Sauvé Memorial Cup the trophy is awarded to the best team in the National Ringette League. Canada's Rick Mercer visited the National Ringette League's Cambridge Turbos in 2009 to shoot an episode about ringette in Canada.

Teams

2022–23

In 2022–23, the league entered its 18th season with thirteen teams competing:

 BC Thunder
 Edmonton Black Gold Rush
 Edmonton WAM!
 Calgary RATH
 Saskatchewan Heat
 Manitoba Herd

 Nepean Ravens
 Waterloo Wildfire
 Cambridge Turbos
 Gatineau Fusion

 Montreal Mission
 Rive-Sud Révolution
 Atlantic Attack

Participation 
Ringette is played in all 10 Canadian provinces and the Northwest Territories and involves an average of 50,000 participants a year. In the 2017–18 Canadian ringette season, 31,168 players were registered to play ringette in Canada, the highest known participation rate for a season. Players participated on nearly 2,000 teams in eight age categories across the country. The largest increases were observed in New Brunswick and Nova Scotia, Alberta and Saskatchewan. The Covid-19 pandemic which began in 2019 had a negative impact on registration rates.

In Canada in 1979 there was an estimated 4,500 girls playing ringette across the country, but by 1983 (20 years after ringette was created) there were over 14,500, marking an increase in participation of roughly 10,000 Canadian girls. That same year the number of players registered in the female category of ice hockey in Canada, which was almost a century old, was a mere 5,379, less than 40% of ringette's numbers. A small decrease in the number of ringette athletes after 1998 has been attributed at least partially to women's ice hockey being recognized officially as an Olympic sport that same season, but is largely considered due to the decision by major governing body's for the women's hockey game to exclude body checking. Body checking was removed from the women's ice hockey program by the International Ice Hockey Federation after the 1990 IIHF Women's World Championship. Despite the inclusion of women's ice hockey in the Olympics, there remains a striking absence of recognition towards the fact that female players had historically employed body checking as an element of their game. After women's hockey's introduction to the Olympic Games, it quickly gained popularity; however, within a decade of its inaugural year in the Olympics, ringette saw a resurgence of registrations in Canada.

Brief decline and comeback
Between 1979 and 1983, roughly 10,000 new Canadian players registered to play ringette. Between 1985 and 1987 the sport continued to experience a notable increase in player registrations in Canada growing from roughly 20,000 registered players in 1985 to over 27,000 in 1987, a substantial increase within less than a five-year period. While the 1996–1997 ringette season saw a peak record of 27,058 registrations nationwide, a slight drop occurred in registration rates during the following season in 1997–98 whereby 25,951 players were recorded to have registered in Canada. However, rates began climbing again after the 2002–03 season and by the 2007–08 season, 27,197 players had registered, breaking the sport's highest recorded registration rate in Canada which had been set a decade before in 1996–97. By 2017–18 Canada recorded a record breaking 31,168 registered players, the highest number of players ever recorded in the nation's history.

Recorded registrations
The number of ringette registrations in Canada from 1979 to 2022 is as follows:

University and college ringette 
In Canada, ringette players have the opportunity to play their sport at the university and occasionally the college level in several provinces. The organizing body for the post-secondary level is known as the Canadian University & College Ringette Association, which is abbreviated "CUCRA". The organization was previously known by its initial name, "Canadian University Ringette" (CUR). CUCRA is not affiliated with U Sports or Ontario University Athletics (OUA) as of yet but aims to become so in the future.

The first tournament took place at the University of Winnipeg in 1999. Other Canadian universities previously known to have had teams include Lakehead University (Thunder Bay, Ontario), Mount Royal University (Calgary), Simon Fraser University (British Columbia), and the Université de Sherbrooke (Quebec).

Due to the Covid-19 pandemic, several competitions for CUR's college and university ringette athletes were cancelled. Some teams did not reconvene post Covid-19.

Canadian university and college teams

University Challenge Cup 

The University Challenge Cup (UCC) is an annual competition in Canada which groups together ringette teams from various Canadian universities in two conferences and is organized by the Canadian University & College Ringette Association, (abbreviated "CUCRA"). The first competition took place at the University of Winnipeg in 1999. The competition typically involves in excess of 350 players, coaches, referees and tournament staff.

The University of Calgary, (Calgary Dinos in Calgary, Alberta) have won the most Tier 1 national titles to date since the UCC's inaugural year in 1999. Both the University of Western Ontario (Western Mustangs in London, Ontario) and McMaster University (McMaster Marauders in Hamilton, Ontario) are tied for the most titles won in Tier 2 competition, a division which was formed in 2009.

Ontario University Ringette Provincials
In the province of Ontario, a University division is hosted by Ringette Ontario at the Ontario Provincial Ringette Championships where University ringette teams compete for the Dave Bennett University Cup. Some Ontario ringette tournaments also host University pools.

National competitions

Canadian Ringette Championships

Canada's elite ringette players compete at the end of every ringette season in the Championnats Canadien d'Ringuette/Canadian Ringette Championships, commonly called "the Nationals", which also includes the final competition for the National Ringette League (NRL). The Canadian Ringette Championships, typically held each April, took place for the first time in 1979 in Winnipeg, Manitoba. This tournament was created to determine the Canadian champions in the categories of Under-16 years, Under-19 years and Open (replaced by the National Ringette League since 2008).

Canada Winter Games 

While ringette was invented in 1963, the first Canada Games, a multi-sport event, was held four years later in 1967 in Quebec City. Ringette did not become a part of the Canada Winter Games programme until 1991. Former Ringette Canada President, Betty Shields, is considered to have been, "instrumental in ringette’s entry to the Canada Winter Games". The ringette program takes part during one of the two weeks of the Canada Winter Games. Competition usually begins on Mondays followed by the semi-final on Friday evening with the National final taking place on Saturdays. The best ringette athletes from 10 Canadian provinces are selected to compete on their representative provincial teams.

The Canada Winter Games are considered an important national event in Canada and is considered to be a key event in the development of Canada's young athletes. The competition involves the best young Canadian athletes competing in their age groups. The entire event is of two weeks in duration and is held every four years.

Provincial competitions

Provincial championships
Annual province-wide championship competitions are organized in a number of Canadian provinces for various skill levels and age groups.

Provincial Winter Games 
In Canada a number of provinces organize province-wide, winter-based, multi-sport competitions either annually or biannually. These events are typically referred to as provincial "Winter Games". However, ringette is not included in every provincial winter games program and it depends on which province is involved.

Other competitions
Several Canadian cities and regions also have their own annual competitions.

Eastern Canadian Ringette Championships

The Eastern Canadian Ringette Championships (ECRC) is an annual competition organized strictly for ringette teams from the eastern part of Canada. The competition involves teams from Nova Scotia, Prince Edward Island, New Brunswick, Quebec and Ontario. The first event was held in 2002. Since 2002, teams from the participating provinces compete in the following four divisions: U14AA, U16A, U19A and 18+ A.

Western Canadian Ringette Championships
The Western Canadian Ringette Championships (WCRC) is an annual competition organized strictly for ringette teams from the western part of Canada, however, it is not organized by Ringette Canada. The tournament's inaugural year was in 2003. Typically held at the end of March, the competition involves teams from Manitoba, Saskatchewan, Alberta and British Columbia competing in U14, U16, U19 and 18+ divisions of competition.

Each of the four Western Canadian Provinces is eligible to send one provincial team to compete in each age division. The Host is able to enter a host team at U16, U19 and 18+ to create a five team division. U14 is a 10-team division made up of two teams from each province and two wildcard draws.

Largest Canadian tournament
The largest ringette tournament in Canada is the annual Esso Golden Ring Tournament in Calgary, Alberta which takes place in the month of January.

Nova Scotia
The City of Lakes Tournament (COLT) in Dartmouth, Nova Scotia, is the province's largest ringette tournament.

Cross-sport participation

Bandy

Several of Canada's national level ringette players have also played bandy for the Canadian women's national bandy team. Both the women's and men's Canadian national bandy teams are based out of Winnipeg, Manitoba.

Several of Canada's women's national bandy players also played in the National Ringette League and on Canada's National Ringette Team. The bandy team has included top level ringette players like Ainsley Ferguson, Carrie Nash, Shelly Hruska, Amy Clarkson, and Lindsay Burns. Their best results are 4th at the 2007, 2010, 2012, and 2016 Women's Bandy World Championships. Canada's first goal scored in the nations history of organized women's bandy was by Lindsay Burns, a former member of Canada's national ringette team.

Male players 
In Canada male players are uncommon since numerous other winter team sports options for them exist such as ice hockey, bandy, and broomball. Boys are restricted to competing at the "B" level or lower in many ringette organizations since the sport is meant to highlight, cater to, and increase participation among females. Male players compete at the AA level in limited areas where the sport is played. Boys have participated in Under-9 (U9) or Under-6 (U6) divisions in some Canadian provinces.

Olympic ringette team
Currently the sport of ringette is not recognized by the International Olympic Committee (IOC) and therefore is not a part of the Winter Olympic programme. The sport has a relatively narrow profile and is played predominately in four nations: Canada, Finland, Sweden, and the United States. The IOC has a firm rule that no new sport will be allowed into the Olympics unless it is organized for and played by both females and males at the international level.

Ringette is played predominantly by female athletes and the Olympic Charter has higher requirements for male participation. The charter stipulates that ringette be played extensively in seventy-five countries by men on four different continents and played by women in no less than forty countries and on three different continents. Outreach efforts by officials in Canada and Finland to have the sport recognized by the IOC have not been successful thusfar.

Further reading
 Collins, Kenneth Stewart (2004). The Ring Starts Here: An Illustrated History of Ringette. 
 Hall, Margaret Ann (2016). The Girl and the Game: A History of Women's Sport in Canada. University of Toronto Press.
 Hall, Margaret Ann; Pfister, Gertrud. Honoring the Legacy: Fifty Years of the International Association of Physical Education and Sport for Girls and Women.

References

External links 
 International Ringette Federation
  Ringette Canada
    Ringette Finland
   Team USA Ringette
    Sweden Ringette Association 
   Ringette Slovakia
   Czech Ringette
  Archives | Ringette Manitoba 
  Ringette Calgary History
   Ringette Finland History (archived)
   Turku Ringette History
  Ringette | Story Archives | University of Calgary Athletics

 
Women's team sports
History of women's sports
Rivalry in women's sports
Semi-professional sports
Semi-professional sports leagues
Sports originating in Canada
Sport in North Bay, Ontario
Games and sports introduced in 1963
Variations of hockey
Women's national sports teams of Canada